Faros Keratsiniou B.C. (alternate spellings: Pharos, Keratsini), or simply, Faros B.C., is a Greek professional basketball club that is based in Keratsini, Piraeus, Athens, Greece. The club's full name is Athlitikos Omilos Faros Keratsiniou, which means Sporting Group Lighthouse Keratsini (Greek: Αθλητικός Όμιλος Φάρος Κερατσινίου), abbreviated as A.O. Faros Keratsiniou. The club's emblem is a lighthouse.

In 2017, the professional team merged with G.S. Larissas Faros, which received the spot of Keratsiniou in the Greek Basket League.

Logos

History
Faros was founded in 1971, by Stefanos Lachanis. The team had its best season to date, in the 2014–15 season, when Faros was promoted to the 2nd-tier level Greek 2nd Division, because of the relegation of Panelefsiniakos to the Greek B League (Greek 3rd-tier level), due to financial problems.

During its first season (2015–16) in the Greek A2 League, Faros had a terrific start to their season, and managed to break the record for the best win/loss start in the league, which was previously set by Dafnis, during the 1998–99 season. That same season, they also managed to make it to the Greek Cup's 2016 Final. Faros became just the third team in history to make it to the Greek Cup Final, while not being a current member of the top-tier level basketball league in Greece, the Greek Basket League, after Panellinios in 1987, and Rethymno Aegean in 2007, previously accomplished the feat.

In order to reach the 2016 Greek Cup Final, Faros first beat Pagrati of the Greek 2nd Division, by a score of 79 to 57. They then beat 5 top-tier Greek First Division clubs in succession: Kolossos Rodou (70–66), Lavrio (76–56), Trikala Aries (82–67), Nea Kifissia (61–59); and in the Greek Cup semifinals, they beat PAOK, of the European 2nd-tier level league, the EuroCup, by a score of 69–65.

In the 2016–17 season, Faros won one of the Greek 2nd Division's league promotions to the top-tier level Greek Basket League. However, in the summer of 2017, Faros merged with G.S. Larissas, which then took the club's place in the upcoming Greek Basket League 2017–18 season. Faros retained all of its amateur and junior clubs.

Arena
The club plays its home games at the Pantelis Nikolaidis Indoor Hall, a small arena with a capacity of about 1,000.

Season by season

Honors and titles
Greek Cup
Runners-up (1): 2015–16
Greek Second Division
Runners-up (2): 2015–16, 2016–17

Notable players

  Nikos Angelopoulos
  Marios Batis
  Michalis Kakiouzis
  Vangelis Karampoulas
  Sotiris Katoufas
  Dimitrios Kompodietas
  Nikos Liakopoulos
  Spyros Magkounis
  Ioannis Milonas
  Filippos Moschovitis
  Manos Papamakarios
  Christos Petrodimopoulos
  Gaios Skordilis
  Kostas Kakaroudis
  Fotis Vasilopoulos
  Ioannis Dimakos

References

External links
Official Website 
Official Blog Site 
Twitter Account 
YouTube Account 
Eurobasket.com Team Page

1971 establishments in Greece
Basketball teams in Greece